Lizardo may refer to:

 Lizardo (name), a name of Spanish and Portuguese origin
 Lizardo Bus Lines, a company in the Philippines
 Emilio Lizardo, a character in the 1984 film The Adventures of Buckaroo Banzai Across the 8th Dimension
 Lizardo (Pokémon), Japanese name for Charmeleon, a Generation I Pokémon

See also
 Antón Lizardo, Veracruz, Mexico